José Agustín Mauri (born 16 May 1996) is a professional footballer who plays as a  midfielder for Argentine Primera División club Sarmiento.
Born in Argentina, Mauri is of Italian descent and has represented Italy internationally at youth level.

Club career

Parma
Mauri made his debut for Parma as a substitute on 3 December 2013 in the fourth round of the Coppa Italia,  replacing Gianni Munari for the last 27 minutes of a 4–1 home win against A.S. Varese 1910 at the Stadio Ennio Tardini.

On 11 April 2015, he scored the only goal in a 1–0 win against Juventus, with his team in last position and the opponents leading the league. He described it as "the happiest day of my life".

Milan
At the start of the 2015–16 season, Mauri joined Milan on a four-year deal on a free transfer. However, Milan also paid €4 million to unknown parties. Mauri made his first full debut on 1 December, playing 99 minutes of a Coppa Italia game against Crotone, with Milan winning 3–1 after extra time. He made his Serie A debut for Milan against Chievo Verona on 13 March 2016, playing the last five minutes of the 0–0 away draw.

Empoli
On 30 August 2016, he was loaned out to Serie A club Empoli for the season.

Talleres
On 27 September 2019, he moved to Argentine Primera División side Talleres de Córdoba.

Sporting Kansas City
On 5 August 2021, Mauri signed with MLS side Sporting Kansas City on a one-and-a-half year deal. In April 2022, the club mutually agreed to terminate contract of Mauri.

International career
As one of his grandmothers was Italian, Mauri is eligible for both Argentina and Italy. Despite playing for Italy's youth international squads, Mauri declined a call-up to the Italian U20 squad, declaring his desire to represent solely Argentina in international competition.

Personal life
His older brother Juan Mauri is also a football player and signed with Milan at the same time as José did.

Career statistics

Club

References

External links
 

1996 births
Living people
People from La Pampa Province
Association football midfielders
Italian footballers
Italy youth international footballers
Argentine footballers
Italian people of Argentine descent
Argentine people of Italian descent
Serie A players
Parma Calcio 1913 players
A.C. Milan players
Empoli F.C. players
Talleres de Córdoba footballers
Sporting Kansas City players
Major League Soccer players